In 1795 Admiral Hugh Cloberry Christian mounted an expedition to the West Indies. The expedition sailed on 6 October, 16 November, and 9 December, but weather forced the vessels to put back. The fleet finally successfully sailed on 20 March to invade St Lucia, with troops under Lieutenant-General Sir Ralph Abercromby. St Lucia surrendered to the British on 25 May. The British went on to capture Saint Vincent and to put down Fédon's rebellion in Grenada. 

Among the transport vessels of the expedition were 16 chartered from the British East India Company (EIC).

In addition to the vessels hired from the EIC, the expedition used a number of vessels belonging to the Transport Board  on either long-term or short-term contracts.

 
Alexander
Betsey
Brothers
Catherine
Concord
Countess of Trautsmansdorff
Crown
Eagle
Elizabeth
Enterprize
Fowler
Galatea

Hope
Horn
Polly
Rambler
Sally
Somerset
Success
Swan
Swansea
Thomas & Mary
Three Sisters
Travellor
Ulysses
Vine
William Beckford

Other 

Mentioned in The Times:
Jane

Citations and references
Citations

References

Age of Sail merchant ships of England
Ships of the British East India Company
Lists of sailing ships